Palhinhaea cernua, synonym Lycopodiella cernua, is a plant in the family Lycopodiaceae, commonly known as the staghorn clubmoss. The Hawaiian name for the plant is wāwaeʻiole, or "rat's foot". It has a substantial number of scientific synonyms in several genera. The genus Palhinhaea is accepted in the Pteridophyte Phylogeny Group classification of 2016 (PPG I), but not in other classifications which submerge the genus in Lycopodiella.

Distribution
Palhinhaea cernua is a widespread pan-tropical species, found mostly at higher elevations in subtropical mountain climates of tropical Africa, Asia, the Pacific Islands and the Neotropics. In Europe, it is found in the Azores (where it is possibly native) and formerly on Madeira. It has been introduced in continental Portugal (Valongo), Sicily and Malta.

It favors bog environments.

Palhinhaea cernua is sometimes cultivated.

References

Further reading 
 Cook Islands Biodiversity Database: http://cookislands.bishopmuseum.org/species.asp?id=6348
 In efloras: http://www.efloras.org/florataxon.aspx?flora_id=12&taxon_id=242330770
 

Lycopodiaceae